Ludovico Pasquali (c.1500–1551) was an Italian-language author from Cattaro.

Life
Pasquali was born and died in Kotor, in the Albania Veneta (today in Montenegro). He was from an ancient Dalmatian family with roots in Florence. He was a friend, admirer and fellow countryman of Giovanni Bona Boliris. Pasquali studied in the University of Padova and -after being enslaved in Crete by the Turks- returned to his hometown where he spent all his remaining life promoting the culture of Renaissance Italy.

He was judged the best "poet" of Venetian Dalmatia during the 16th century.

Pasquali wrote a 1549 collection of poems in Italian, Rime Volgari ("Popular Rhymes" – Italian was often called "volgare", with the meaning of "popular", well into the 16th century: it was thought to be the popular version of Latin). His volume in Latin Carmina ("Poems") was printed in 1551.

Works

 Rime volgari di m. Ludouico Paschale da catharo Dalmatino. Non piu date in luce., In Vinegia: appresso Steffano et Battista cognati al segno de S. Moise, 1549 
 Ludovici Pascalis Iulii Camilli, Molsae, et aliorum illustrium poetarum carmina, ad illustriss. et doctiss. marchionem Auriae Bernardinum Bonifatium per Ludouicum Dulcium nunc primum in lucem aedita., Venetiis: apud Gabrielem Iolitum et fratres De Ferrariis, 1551

Legacy

 described Pasquali as one of the most "Italians" of the Dalmatian poets: he never wrote in Serbo-Croatian, but only in Italian and sometimes in Latin.

The Croatian Encyclopedia describes him as a 'Croatian poet' and notes his works in Italian and Latin.

Notes

See also
Giovanni Bona Boliris
Mariano Bolizza
Dalmatian Italians
Venetian Cattaro

1500 births
1551 deaths
Italian poets
Italian male poets
Montenegrin poets
Montenegrin male writers
People from Kotor
16th-century Italian poets
16th-century male writers